Emporia is a shopping mall located in the Hyllie city district of Malmö, Sweden. It is one of Scandinavia's biggest shopping malls and is situated next to Malmö Arena and the Hyllie railway station. Emporia opened on 25 October 2012 with total construction expenses of about 2 billion Swedish kronor. The architect of the Emporia project is Gert Wingårdh of Wingårdh arkitektkontor. Klepierre  owns the building.

The building has been decorated with sound design and soundscapes created by Radja Sound Design Agency.

Facts and figures
Approximately 200 shops are located in Emporia, with a total area of 93,000 m². The mall is three stories topped with a roof terrace measuring 27,000 m², equivalent to approximately four soccer fields. In total, the mall employs around 3,000 people. According to Emporia, they have around 25,000 visitors per day.

2022 shooting 
On 19 August 2022, two people were shot; one man was killed and a woman was injured inside the shopping mall. A 15-year old male was arrested shortly afterwards. The police stated that the motive appeared gang-related.

Gallery

References

External links

 Official website

Shopping centres in Sweden
Buildings and structures in Malmö
Shopping malls established in 2012
2012 establishments in Sweden
Tourist attractions in Malmö
21st-century establishments in Skåne County
International Style (architecture)